Christina Rieder (born 29 December 1993) is an Austrian biathlete. She was born in Zell am See. She has competed in the Biathlon World Cup, and represented Austria at the Biathlon World Championships 2016.

References

1993 births
Living people
Austrian female biathletes
People from Zell am See
Sportspeople from Salzburg (state)